The Wedding & Bebek Betutu is an Indonesian comedy film produced by Awan Sinema Kreasi (ASIK Production) and directed by Hilman Mutasi, based on original screenplay written by Tantri Arinta and S. Tomo.

The cast consists mainly of actors and comedians previously renowned as regular performers in a popular Indonesian television comedy variety show, Extravaganza, that includes  Tora Sudiro, Ronal Surapradja, Tike Priatnakusumah, Indra Birowo, Aming Sugandhi, Virnie Ismail, Rony Dozer, Sogi Indra Dhuaja, Mieke Amalia, Omesh, Tj Ruth, Ence Bagus, and Edric Tjandra. The Wedding & Bebek Betutu will be the first single project where mostly all the performers reunite and appear together since the show ended in 2009.

The film was announced in a special gathering of the cast, held in a restaurant in South Jakarta area, on February 18, 2015. Filming started on February 23, 2015 in the city of Bandung, West Java, and its outskirts, and concluded in on March 18, 2015.

The Wedding & Bebek Betutu was released in Indonesia on October 8, 2015.

Synopsis 
A group of hotel employees a.k.a. "The Crew" are trying hard to save the wedding of their boss' only daughter, mainly due to some blackmailing problems as well as a non-rejectable demand for special "bebek betutu" (balinese grilled duck) recipe, all of which must be resolved in 24 hours.

Cast
 Tora Sudiro as Januar Edwin, the hotel's chef
 Aming Sugandhi as Tingtong, the wedding organizer
 Omesh as Bagas Wicaksono, the bridegroom
 Sogi Indra Dhuaja as Angga Wijaya, the hotel's banquet manager
 Tike Priatnakusumah as Kokom Komalasari, the hotel's housekeeping
 Edric Tjandra as Mayo Meositta, the hotel's concierge
 Ence Bagus as Muhammad Ikhsan, the hotel's handyman
 Ibob Tarigan as Iwan Kurniawan, the hotel's Doorman
 Mieke Amalia as Rani Sastranegara, the bride's mother
 Ronal Surapradja as Rama Sastranegara, the bride's father
 Adinda Thomas as Lana Sastranegara, the bride
 Tj Ruth as Tuti Wicaksono, the bridegroom's mother
 Indra Birowo as Edo Wicaksono, the bridegroom's father
 Virnie Ismail as Tantri, the wedding equipment vendor
 Marcel Chandrawinata as Alex Handi, the bride's ex-boyfriend
 Kiena Dwita as Lisa Soerjo, the bride's cousin
 Rony Dozer as Aam Khanam, another wedding organizer
 Muhammad Fachroni as Kang Peppa
 Erwin Moron as a vegetable seller
 Ery Makmur as a police officer

The film also features some Cameos primarily of Bandung's iconic public figures, most notably of which is by the Mayor  Ridwan Kamil, who briefly appears as himself. Others include comedian Joe P-Project, comedian and TV presenter Muhammad Farhan, social and cultural activist Budi Dalton, rock musician Stevie Item, as well as actor and musician Eza Yayang.

Production

Development

Filming
Filming commenced on February 23, 2015 at GH Universal, a 105-rooms five-stars hotel with Italian-renaissance architecture located in the northern part of Bandung. The hotel also serves as the main setting of the story. Aside from the hotel, filming also took place around downtown Bandung, as well as some notable places of the city's immediate surroundings, including at the lake Patenggang in Ciwidey, Bandung Regency. Filming was wrapped on March 18, 2015.

Release
The Wedding & Bebek Betutu was scheduled to be released in Indonesia on October 8, 2015.

References

Footnotes

External links
 

2010s Indonesian-language films
2015 films